The rufous-vented laughingthrush (Pterorhinus gularis) is a species of bird in the family Leiothrichidae.
It is found in Bangladesh, Bhutan, India, Laos, Myanmar, and Vietnam.
Its natural habitats are subtropical or tropical moist lowland forest and subtropical or tropical moist montane forest.

This species was formerly placed in the genus Garrulax but following the publication of a comprehensive molecular phylogenetic study in 2018, it was moved to the resurrected genus Pterorhinus.

References

rufous-vented laughingthrush
Birds of Bhutan
Birds of Northeast India
Birds of Laos
Birds of Myanmar
rufous-vented laughingthrush
Taxonomy articles created by Polbot
Taxobox binomials not recognized by IUCN